Peterson Thomas "Pete" Orr (born June 8, 1979) is a Canadian former professional baseball infielder. He played in Major League Baseball (MLB) for the Atlanta Braves, Washington Nationals and Philadelphia Phillies.

Amateur career

High school
Orr attended Newmarket High School in Newmarket, Ontario while playing baseball for the Ontario Blue Jays.

College
Orr attended Galveston Community College in Galveston, Texas.

Professional career

Atlanta Braves

In  spent most of the season with the Double-A Greenville Braves of the Southern League, hitting .249 with two homers, 36 RBIs and 36 runs scored in 89 games. He also hit .392 with eight RBIs in 17 games with Class-A Advanced Myrtle Beach.

Orr spent the  season with Double-A Greenville, batting .226 with two homers and 31 RBIs in 98 games. He was named a Southern League Baseball America Double-A All-Star.

He established career highs in average, .320, hits, 147, doubles, 16, triples, 10, stolen bases, 24 and runs scored 69. He was selected to play in the International League All-Star game. He was named International League April Player of the Month, posting a .381 batting average with four doubles, one triple and five RBIs. He ranked fifth in the IL and fourth among Braves Minor Leaguers in average, tied second in the IL and led Braves Minor Leaguers in triples, tied for sixth in the IL and led Braves Minor Leaguers in hits and tied for seventh among Braves Minor Leaguers in stolen bases. Orr won the Bill Lucas Award as the player who best represents the Braves organization on and off the field by the 400 Club. He was also part of Team Canada who finished in fourth place at the 2004 Summer Olympics.

Orr made his Major League debut for the Braves on April 5, . He proved to be a versatile player, playing second base, third base, and various outfield positions during the 2005 season. Orr also played for Canada in the 2006 World Baseball Classic and the 2009 World Baseball Classic.

Orr was optioned to Triple-A Richmond on July 5, when the Braves called up Jo-Jo Reyes from Triple-A Richmond to make his Major League debut. He was brought up again on August 27.

Orr was designated for assignment by the Atlanta Braves on November 20, 2007, and was released on November 28, 2007.

Washington Nationals
In December 2007, Orr signed a minor league contract with the Washington Nationals and on June 21, his contract was selected by the Nationals along with right-handed pitcher Steven Shell.

On October 30, 2008, Orr rejected his assignment to AAA and became a free agent. However, he returned to the team two weeks later, signing a minor league deal, playing with the Syracuse Chiefs in the International League, with a chance to earn a spot on the team in the spring.

Philadelphia Phillies

On November 11, 2010, Orr signed with the Philadelphia Phillies.  During spring training play, he led the major leagues in triples, with 5, subsequently becoming a member of the team's Opening Day roster.  After spending the  season with both the Phillies and the Lehigh Valley IronPigs, their AAA affiliate, he became a free agent on October 18.

On November 3, Orr re-signed a minor league contract with the Phillies, receiving an invite to spring training.  He was again included on the team's Opening Day roster at the onset of the  season. He elected free agency on October 8.

Milwaukee Brewers
Orr signed a minor league deal with the Milwaukee Brewers on January 27, 2014, and spent the 2014 season with their Triple-A affiliate Nashville Sounds.

Orr signed another minor league contract with the Brewers on November 7, 2014. He started the 2015 season with Milwaukee's new Triple-A affiliate, the Colorado Springs Sky Sox.

Orr was hired by Milwaukee Brewers in October 2016 to be pro baseball scout.

References

"Me and My Number", Sports Illustrated. 41, July 24, 2006.

External links

1979 births
Living people
Águilas del Zulia players
Canadian expatriate baseball players in Venezuela
Atlanta Braves players
Baseball people from Ontario
Baseball players at the 2004 Summer Olympics
Baseball players at the 2015 Pan American Games
Canadian expatriate baseball players in the United States
Canadian people of Scottish descent
Colorado Springs Sky Sox players
Columbus Clippers players
Greenville Braves players
Jamestown Jammers players
Lehigh Valley IronPigs players
Major League Baseball players from Canada
Major League Baseball second basemen
Milwaukee Brewers scouts
Myrtle Beach Pelicans players
Nashville Sounds players
Olympic baseball players of Canada
Pan American Games gold medalists for Canada
Pan American Games medalists in baseball
Philadelphia Phillies players
Richmond Braves players
Sportspeople from Richmond Hill, Ontario
Syracuse Chiefs players
Washington Nationals players
World Baseball Classic players of Canada
2006 World Baseball Classic players
2009 World Baseball Classic players
2013 World Baseball Classic players
2015 WBSC Premier12 players
2017 World Baseball Classic players
Medalists at the 2015 Pan American Games